John Moore (born 1949) is an Irish retired hurling referee. Born in Waterford, he became one of the top referees throughout the 1980s and 1990s and officiated at several All-Ireland finals in minor, under-21 and senior levels.

References

1949 births
Living people
Hurling referees